WISH  is an album by Janice Vidal.

Track listing 
Disc 1
CD 1 
 Wish (New Song) 
 心有不甘 (New Song) 
 深愛 
 夏日傾情 
 一場誤會 
 愛才 
 愛你還愛你 
 今夜你不會來 
 越幫越忙 
 My Cookie Can 
 口花花 
 無所謂 
 主角愛我 
 我愛呼吸 
 霎眼嬌 
 拍錯拖 
 Rainbows 
 Goodbye 
 Chocolate Ice

CD 2 
 殘酷遊戲 (New Song) 
 你的眼神 (New Song) 
 離家出走 
 大哥 
 心亂如麻 
 就算世界無童話 
 My Love My Fate 
 情深說話未曾講 
 陰天假期 
 雜技 
 愛深過做人 
 寒命 
 你知道我在等你們分手嗎 
 如水 
 十個他不如你一個 
 不可一世 
 Please 
 Morning

DVD 
 殘酷遊戲 (New Song – MV) 
 Wish (New Song – MV) 
 Rainbows (MV) 
 Please (MV) 
 Pretty (MV) 
 離家出走 (MV) 
 心亂如麻 (MV) 
 愛才 (MV) 
 愛你還愛你 (MV) 
 越幫越忙 (MV) 
 My Love My Fate (MV) 
 十個他不如你一個 (MV) 
 一場誤會 (MV) 
 今夜你不會來 (MV) 
 無所謂 (MV) 
 大哥 (MV) 
 雜技 (MV) 
 24 (MV)

External links 
 A music
 [ All-Music Guide]

2010 albums
Janice Vidal albums